You Hold the Key is Beth Nielsen Chapman's third album ('Hearing it first' was her first, in 1980).  It was released in 1993 on Reprise Records, and features a duet with British singer-songwriter and Mike + The Mechanics vocalist/keyboardist Paul Carrack, called "In the Time It Takes".

The title of this album, as well as the song title it is named after, are from a line in the song "Open Your Heart", by US singer Madonna.

Track listing

Production
Produced By Frank Filipetti, Paul Samwell-Smith & Jim Ed Norman
Associate Producers: Beth Nielsen Chapman, Danny Kee, Ivy Skoff
Recorded & Engineered By Keith Grant & Robert Tassi
Second Engineers: Donny Bott, Mark Capps, Robert Charles, Jon Dickson, Shawn McLean, Chris Ludwinsky, Fred Mercer, Adrian Moore, Brian Pollack, Thom Russo & Ben Wallach
Mixed By Frank Filipetti & Chris Lord-Alge
Mastered By Ted Jensen

Personnel
Beth Nielsen Chapman - vocals, acoustic and electric guitars, keyboards, programming
Russ Kunkel, Paul Leim - drums
Tom Roady - percussion
Jimmy Bralower - drum programming
Martin Allcock, Will Lee, Michael Rhodes, Leland Sklar - bass guitar
Mark Casstevens, Andrew Gold, Kenny Greenberg, Josh Leo, Simon Nicol, Jim Ryan - guitar
Nick Bicat, Robbie Buchanan, Teese Gohl, Dave Innis, Mike Lawler, Matt Rollings - keyboards, programming
Jim Horn, Andy Snitzer - saxophone
Martin Allcock - dulcimer
Rod McGaha - trumpet
Kathryn Trickell - pipes
Miriam Keogh - harp
London Symphony Orchestra - strings

References

1993 albums
Beth Nielsen Chapman albums
Reprise Records albums
Albums produced by Jim Ed Norman